Note: Items which are indented one level from the name of a program are subsections, topics, or subprograms of that one.

HTV1

An toàn giao thông thành phố
Bạn cần biết
Bản tin thời sự tổng hợp
Chương trình tổng hợp
Chuyện nghề
Chuyện trưa 12G
Sách hay & bạn đọc
Thế giới 24 giờ
Thể thao tổng hợp
Thông tin công cộng
Thông tin dân sự - rao vặt
Thông tin y tế
Xổ số Kiến thiết Thành phố
5 phút mỗi ngày
24h toàn cảnh
Ai? việc gì? ở đâu? khi nào? 
Asian Top Band 
Bản tin HTV1
Bản tin buổi tối
Bản tin nông nghiệp & phát triển nông thôn
Bản tin tiếng nước ngoài
Bản tin tài chính chứng khoán
Bản tin tổng hợp 
Bản tin văn hóa xã hội
Bản tin xúc tiến thương mại 
Bật mí phim truyền hình
Biến động thị trường
Bông lúa vàng
Câu chuyện muôn đời
Chào Việt Nam
Chung tay vì cộng đồng
Chung tay vì cộng đồng - Cho bạn, Cho tôi, Cho chúng ta
Chương trình thiếu nhi
Chuyện đời thường 
Chuyện hậu trường 
Chuyện nhỏ mà không nhỏ
Chuyện khó tin
Cơ hội cho bệnh nhân nghèo
Cuộc đua kỳ thú
Cuộc sống quanh ta
Dịch vụ gia đình
Du lịch & Cuộc sống
Duyên nội trợ
Đẹp Fashion Show
Đẹp hơn mỗi ngày 
Điểm đến cuối tuần 
Đối thoại 
Giải thưởng cải lương Trần Hữu Trang
Giọng ca vàng
Giữ lấy hành tinh xanh
Góc thư giãn 
Hành trình đến và đi
Hãy dành 5 phút 
Kết nối người & việc
Kết quả xổ số kiến thiết
Khí hậu và môi trường 
Khỏe đẹp cùng Yoga
Khoa học công nghệ
Khoảnh khắc đẹp
Lướt cùng cảm xúc 
Mạng lưới trẻ
Màu thủy tinh 
Một nửa thế giới 
Mua & bán
Muôn nẻo đường đời 
Nắng mới 
Ngôi nhà Việt
Ngày hạnh phúc
Nhân vật & đối thoại
Phía sau màn ảnh 
Quyền năng số 10 
Sài Gòn buổi sáng
Sống trò chuyện
Sức khỏe cộng đồng
Tài chính chứng khoán
Tạp chí công nghệ
Tạp chí kinh tế 24/7
Tin thế giới
Toàn dân phòng cháy chữa cháy
Thế giới giải trí
Thế giới ngày qua
Thị trường ngày qua
Thông tin cập nhật các chỉ số
Thông tin chứng khoán 
Thông tin giải trí
Thông tin giáo dục
Thông tin kinh tế
Thông tin thị trường 
Thông tin văn bản mới
Thời tiết khí hậu
Thời trang và làm đẹp
Thư giãn cùng HTV1
Tình khúc xưa và nay 
Travellers
Trò chơi tương tác truyền hình (mua từ Phần Lan):
Giải ô số Sudoku
Quạ 3 gang 
Vườn rau
Trở về với chính mình
Vòng quanh thế giới 
Xã hội và đời sống
Xúc tiến thương mại

HTV2

2 ngày 1 đêm - 2 Days & 1 Night (Korea version)
Ăn đi rồi kể -  Delicious Drama Tour
365 khao khát đỉnh cao
ABC Barkey
Ai cũng bật cười - Laugh Out Loud
Ai là số 1 - ? (Korea)
Ai thông minh hơn học sinh lớp 5? - Are You Smarter than a 5th Grader?
Bản tin trưa
Bếp vui bùng vị 
Bistro K - Quán ăn hạnh phúc 
Bộ tứ ảo thuật
Ca sĩ mặt nạ - The Masked Singer
Câu lạc bộ thể thao
Chuyện khó đỡ
Cuộc sống muôn màu
Cười đủ kiểu
Con đến từ hành tinh nào 
Dinh dưỡng tối ưu
Điền kinh Zurich
Đưa em về nhà - Drive Me Home
FAQ cùng sao 
Giải mã K Stars
Hoài Linh phiêu lưu ký 
Kết nối cùng Rap Việt
Khám phá ẩm thực 
Khám phá Malaysia cùng Martin Yan
Khoảnh khắc thay đổi số phận
KPOP chọn lọc
KTOU
Kỳ án Đông Tây kim cổ
Lần đầu tôi kể
Lần đầu xuân kể
Lướt cùng cảm xúc
Màn bạc sôi động
Muốn ăn phải lăn vào bếp
Muôn màu sắc Việt
Mỹ nhân hành động
Người ấy là ai - Who Is Single
Người phụ nữ chiến thắng
Người tập sự của Donald Trump - Donald Trump's Apprentice
Nhà tạo mẫu đẳng cấp
Nhanh như chớp nhí - Little Lightning (Fah Laeb Dek)
Nhịp sống thể thao
Nuôi dưỡng tâm hồn
Nữ vận động viên xuất sắc
Phải đi mới biết 
Phiên tòa tình yêu - Love Judge (Kadee See Chompoo)
Phim truyện
Phù thủy đường phố
Rap Việt - The Rapper   (commingsoon)
Sao âm nhạc
Sao thế giới
Sao và sự kiện
Sea show
Siêu mẫu Mỹ
Siêu thử thách –  Impossible Challenge
Siêu trí tuệ Việt Nam - The Brain 
Sợi mì và những huyền thoại
Song ca cùng thần tượng
Sóng VieON
Sự kiện thể thao
Sự kiện thể thao trong tuần
Tài tiếu tuyệt
Tám thời chín sự
Tạp chí Olympic
Tạp chí quyền anh
Thể dục dụng cụ châu Âu
Thể thao
Thể thao sáng thứ 7
Thế giới 24 giờ
Thời sự HTV
Tin buổi sáng
Thiên tài bóng đá
Thông tin kết quả các trận đấu trong ngày
Thông tin tổng hợp
Toàn cảnh thể thao
Trà mã huyền bí
Trang trại MC Donald
Từ lạ thành thương
Tường thuật thể thao
Vấn đề thể thao
Vitamin Cười
Vitamin 365 ngày vui khỏe 
Vua đầu bếp Mỹ nhí
Xine Việt tại nhà
Yoga cho mọi người

HTV3

Phim hoạt hình
Anh văn giao tiếp
Ba lô xì tin
Bản tin trẻ
Biệt đội tay sạch hành động
Bạn trẻ bốn phương
Cây nguyện ước
Căn phòng mơ ước - Groom my room 
Cặp nhiệt độ
Chat với ngôi sao
Chuyện ngày xưa
Chuyện thiếu nhi
Cuối tuần rực rỡ
Daisuke & những câu chuyện về thời trang
Đua tài ẩm thực
Giấc mơ âm nhạc
Giờ đọc
Góc nhỏ xì tin
Kể chuyện em nghe 
Life of mammals
Món Á phải thử
Nhật kí bỉm sữa
Nhịp cầu tuổi trẻ
Nhịp sống trẻ
Những bà mẹ thành thị - Moms in town
Những bài học thú vị
Ôn thi đại học
Phim truyện nước ngoài
Phim truyện thiếu nhi
Phong cách xì tin
Rock on Yan
Rồng rắn lên mây
Sao 24/7
Siêu bản tin
Teletubies
Thần đồng âm nhạc - Wonderkids
Thực hiện ước mơ
Trong vườn nhà
Trò chuyện - chuyện trò
Thế giới muôn loài
Tuổi hồng xì tin
Việt Nam đất nước tôi yêu
Vui cùng con, hát cùng con

HTV4 (HTV Key)

Chuyện nghề
Giáo dục hướng nghiệp
Thay đổi góc nhìn
10 nguyên tắc bảo vệ gia đình
48 giờ trải nghiệm 
1001
Anh văn giao tiếp  
Ấn tượng Học sinh - Sinh viên Việt Nam
Bạn có thể làm được
Bổ trợ kiến thức (THCS, THPT)
Câu chuyện thương hiệu
Công dân với pháp luật
Cửa sổ tri thức
Dạy tiếng nước ngoài
Di sản văn hóa thế giới
Để cuộc sống mãi xanh
Đồ họa máy tính
Em yêu khoa học
Giáo dục sức khỏe
Hoa tay
Học viện thể thao
Kết nối giờ thứ 6
Khám phá Linux
Khẳng định giá trị bản thân
Lăng kính cuộc sống
Lời chào âm nhạc
Nhật ký tuổi hoa
Nhịp cầu du học
Ôn tập trực tuyến lớp 9 & 12  
Ôn thi đại học
Phim tài liệu nước ngoài
Sinh tố 7 màu
Sống đẹp
Sống khỏe - Sống đẹp
Sức khỏe cho mọi người
Sức khỏe gia đình
Tài sản trí tuệ  
Thanh nhạc phổ thông
Thành phố hôm nay
Toàn cảnh phim ngắn
Truyền thông quản trị
Từ lý luận đến thực tiễn
Từ bốn phương trời
Tự làm đẹp nhà
Văn hóa thế giới
Văn hóa nghệ thuật thế giới
Văn học - Những cảm nhận  
Vật lý ứng dụng
Vòng quanh thế giới

HTV7

100%
2 ngày 1 đêm - 2 Days & 1 Night
3-2-1
 5 giây thành triệu phú  
7 ngày 8 chuyện
7 nụ cười xuân
7 ngày thể thao
12 cá tính lên đường xuyên Việt
12 con giáp - Tám chuyện thiên hạ
40 tuần hạnh phúc
60 giây
365 ngày để yêu 
1000 độ hot
A! đúng rồi
AHA! - AHA! Experience (Japan)
Ai chẳng thích đùa - Joker Family (ก็มาดิคร้าบ)
Ai dám hát - Sing If You Can
Ai nhanh hơn
Ai thông minh hơn học sinh lớp 5 - Are You Smarter Than A 5th Grader 
Ai vào bếp
Album vàng
Alo bác sĩ nghe 
Alo MR Cảnh báo
Alo, phim nghe
Anh chàng độc thân - The Bachelor
Anh tài đường phố
Ảo thuật sắc đẹp
 ATM -? (UK)  
Ăn cho sướng
Âm nhạc của tôi
Âm nhạc và đời sống
Âm nhạc và tuổi trẻ
Ẩm thực kỳ duyên
Ẩm thực nước ngoài
Ẩm thực Việt Nam
Bà mối hẹn hò
Bác sĩ nhi khoa 
Bác sĩ trực tuyến
Bác sĩ 24/7
Bác sĩ gia đình
Bác sĩ ơi, tại sao?
Bậc thầy ẩn danh 
Ban nhạc & bạn trẻ
Bạn có thể làm được
Bạn có thư
Bạn có thực tài
Bạn đời ăn ý
Bạn đường hợp ý
Bạn đường hợp ý - 14400s hạnh phúc 
Bạn đường hợp ý - Biệt đội X6  
Bạn đường hợp ý - Người hùng sàn đấu 
Bạn hỏi - thầy thuốc trả lời
Bạn là ngôi sao - Be A Star 
Bạn muốn hẹn hò - Punchi De Deto 
Bạn trẻ bốn phương 
Bản sắc Việt 
Bản tin 365 
Bản tin buổi sáng
Bản tin kinh tế
Bật mí phim truyền hình
Bây giờ làm sao
Bé khỏe bé ngoan
Bé yêu học ăn
Bệnh viện nụ cười
Bên dòng Mississippi 
Bếp chiến
Bếp nhà mình
Bếp yêu thương
Biếng ăn không phải chuyện nhỏ
Biến hóa hoàn hảo - My Name Is…
Biển của hy vọng - Sea of Hope
Biển đảo quê hương 
Biệt đội chinh phục tự nhiên
 Biệt đội lồng tiếng 
Biệt đội phấn trắng
Biệt đội phụ huynh 4.0  
Biệt đội se duyên
Biệt đội siêu hài
Biệt đội xả xì chét  
Bí kíp vàng
Bí mật đêm chủ nhật - Whose Line Is It Anyway? 
Bí mật gia đình - Family Secrets
Bí quyết của mẹ
Bình luận âm nhạc
Bong bóng thủy tinh
Bóng đá FIFA
Bóng đá hôm nay
Box cuối tuần
Box thư giãn 
Bố con cùng vui
Bố là số 1
Bộ tứ ảo thuật
Bộ ba ăn ý  
Bộ ba ăn ý (2) (coming soon) 
Bộ cánh tình yêu 
Bụng vui bé khỏe thông minh
Búp măng non
Bước chân doanh nhân 
Bước chân khám phá
Bước ra thế giới
Bữa cơm gia đình 
Bữa cơm yêu thương
Bữa ngon nhớ đời
Cả nhà thương nhau  
Cà phê cuối tuần
Cà phê khởi nghiệp 
Cao thủ đấu nhạc - The Big Music Quiz
Ca sĩ bí ẩn
Các bác sĩ nói gì? - The Doctor
Các ông bố nói gì
Camera cảnh báo
Cà phê TEK
Cà tun cà tun
Cài đặt hạnh phúc
Cả nhà cùng vui
Căn bếp vui nhộn
Căn hộ trong mơ - The Apartment
Cẩm nang sống khỏe 
Cận cảnh sàn đấu 
Câu chuyện âm nhạc
Câu chuyện các ngôi sao
Câu chuyện gia đình
Câu chuyện thị trường
Câu chuyện thiếu nhi
Câu chuyện truyền hình
Câu chuyện từ trái tim
Câu chuyện ước mơ
Câu lạc bộ âm nhạc
Câu lạc bộ âm nhạc dân tộc
Câu lạc bộ âm nhạc với đời sống
Câu lạc bộ khoa học trẻ
Câu lạc bộ thể thao
Cầu nối yêu thương
Cầu thủ nhí
Cầu vồng đa sắc
Cầu vồng xanh
Cha anh mẹ em
Cha con hợp sức
Chat với mẹ bỉm sữa
Chào bác sĩ
Chào bạn mới
Chào bé yêu - Hi5!
Chào ngày mới - เรื่องเล่าเช้านี้  (Thailand) 
1000 năm Thăng Long - Hà Nội 
Bất động sản
Đến thăm nhà bạn
Hiểu để yêu thương 
Tài chính thông minh
Tin tức & sự kiện 
Thông tin y học 
Chào tuổi Teen
Chạy đi chờ chi - Running Man Vietnam
Chắp cánh tương lai
Chân dung nhà vô địch
Chìa khóa khỏe đẹp
Chìa khóa sức khỏe 
Chiến binh địa hình
Chiến thắng cùng con
Chiếu phim 
Chinh phục đỉnh Everest
Chinh phục thời gian - Conquer Time (จับเวลาแจก) 
Chinh phục thực khách
Cho con khởi đầu tốt đẹp 
Cho phép được yêu
Cho tim luôn khỏe
Chọn ai đây - Hollywood Squares 
Chọn mặt gửi vàng - Smart Face
Chơi mà học
Chung một mái nhà
Chung sức - Family Feud  
Chung tay vì cộng đồng
Chung tay vì cộng đồng: Vì cuộc sống cộng đồng
Chương trình 3S  
Chương trình chống bạo hành trong gia đình
Chương trình giải trí AXN
Chuyên đề TFS
Chuyên gia nói
Chuyến đi nhớ đời
Chuyến xe âm nhạc
Chuyến xe thời gian
Chuyện 25 giờ
Chuyện 4 mùa 
Chuyện cuối tuần
Blog 24h 
Tiêu điểm hôm nay
Dự báo thời tiết
Chuyện đó chuyện đây
Chuyện đời 
Chuyện đời thường
Chuyện hôm nay
Blog 24h
Hướng nghiệp cùng học sinh 
Tiêu điểm trong ngày
Tiêu điểm hôm nay
Dự báo thời tiết
Chuyện khó hơn ta tưởng
Chuyện không của riêng ai
Chuyện lạ bốn phương
Chuyện ngày xưa 
Chuyện nhỏ - Small Talk
Chuyện nhỏ mà không nhỏ
Chuyện nhỏ phố phường
Chuyện những người thầy
Chuyện phiếm cuối tuần
Chuyện tình yêu
Chuyện trong nhà ngoài phố 
Chuyện trưa
Chuyện trưa 12 giờ 
Chuyện từ những con đường
Chuyện xóm làng
Chúc mừng sinh nhật - Happy Birthday (gameshow) / The Birthday Game
Chúng tôi muốn biết - Are You Stylist 
Cine trong nhà
Có hẹn với HTVC
Có thể bạn chưa biết
Con đã lớn khôn - Hajimete No Otsukai
Con đường cà phê
Con đường cái quan
Con đường chinh phục
Con đường võ học
Con làm việc nhỏ
Con lớn từng ngày
Con thú Jam
Con tôi vô số tội
Còn mãi với thời gian
Cơn sốt bóng đá
Cô bé tinh nghịch
Công nghệ thời đại 4.0
Công nghệ xanh 
Cộng sự ước mơ (coming soon)
Cơ hội mua sắm
Cơ hội đến
Cơ hội đổi đời
Cơm nhà Việt Nam
Cuộc chiến ẩm thực (Kitchen Battle) 
Cuộc đời thật đáng sống
Cuộc đua kỳ thú - The Amazing Race (Asia)  
Cuộc sống là vàng
Cuộc sống mới
Cuộc sống quanh ta
Cuộc sống quanh ta (chương trình ngắn)
Cuộc sống tươi đẹp
Cuộc sống và sức khỏe 
Cùng con vào bếp
Cùng con vững bước
Cùng Heineken trải nghiệm quần vợt đỉnh cao
Cùng HTV hành động xanh 
Cùng nhà nông làm giàu
Cùng trải nghiệm
Cùng xây nhà mới
Cùng xây tương lai
Cưới đi chờ chi
Cười chút chơi

Cười là thua - Laugh And You Lose
Dạ khúc tình yêu
Dạy con từ thuở còn thơ
Dạy ngoại ngữ 
Dạy nhạc trên truyền hình 
Dạy vẽ qua màn ảnh nhỏ
Dấu ấn huyền thoại 
Doanh nhân và Thương hiệu
Doanh trại lớn khôn
Doctor 365
Di sản thế giới
Di sản văn hóa thế giới
Diễn đàn văn hóa nghệ thuật 
Dinh dưỡng diệu kỳ
Dinh dưỡng tối ưu
Du hành ký ức
Du ký cùng hoa hậu
Du lịch kỳ thú 
Du lịch Thành phố Hồ Chí Minh
Du lịch vòng quanh thế giới
Du lịch xa hoa
Dự báo thời tiết (9h00, 12h00, 18h10, 22h30)
Đánh thức giai điệu
Đánh thức sức mạnh tiềm ẩn
Đàn ông phải thế - My Man Can
Đại chiến âm nhạc 
Đại chiến kén rể - Meet the Parents
Đại chiến tứ sắc - Attack 25  
Đào thoát - Raid The Cage
Đăng nhập trái tim - Taken Out
Đập hộp kén rể 
Đầu bếp đỉnh - Top Chef
Đầu bếp thượng đỉnh - Top Chef
Đầu bếp vui tính
Đấu giá may mắn
Đấu trường 9+
Đấu trường đường phố  
Đấu trường tài năng (from 4.4.2023)
Đấu trường tiếu lâm - Funny Warriors  
Đấu trường võ nhạc
Đây là ai
Đây chính là nhảy đường phố - Street Dance Việt Nam 
Đèn xanh đèn đỏ
Đẹp cùng chuyên gia
Đẹp hơn mỗi ngày
Đẹp hơn mỗi ngày (2)
Đẹp và phong cách
Đệ nhất hài Việt
Đi an toàn - về hạnh phúc
Đi tìm dấu tích ba vua
Điều chúng mình chưa biết
Điều gì đã xảy ra
Điều kỳ diệu
Điệu lý quê em
Điểm dừng kế tiếp
Điểm hẹn quê hương 
Điểm số hoàn hảo - Perfect Score
Điểm tin thế thao châu Á
Điểm tin thể thao thế giới 
Điệp vụ đối đầu
Đi sao cho đúng
Đi và đến
Đọ sức âm nhạc - The Fever
Đối mặt cảm xúc 
Đối mặt thời gian - Face the Clock
Đối thoại vì cuộc sống
Đối thủ bí ẩn 
Đối thủ xứng tầm
Đối thủ xứng tầm nhí
Đội bóng trong mơ
Đồ họa máy tính
Đồng hành giải thưởng phim ngắn HTV
Đồng hành huyền thoại 1C
Đồng hành hàng Việt
Đời vẫn đẹp sao
Đúng là một đôi
Đuốc sáng Việt Nam
Đùa như thật - Thật như đùa
Đường đến danh ca vọng cổ
Em yêu khoa học
Flim Việt cuối tuần
Gạch nối yêu thương
Ghép đôi thần tốc 
Gia đình A+
Gia đình hạnh phúc
Gia đình khỏe
Gia đình muôn mặt
Gia đình siêu đẳng
Gia đình siêu khỏe
Gia đình siêu nhộn
Lớp học vui nhộn
Gia đình sô bít
Gia đình song ca - Sing Up For Your Family
Gia đình tài tử
Gia đình thông thái - Family Game Night
Gia đình võ thuật 
Gia đình vui nhộn
Gia đình vui nhộn (2) 
Giai điệu cảm xúc
Giai điệu bạn bè 
Giai điệu bốn phương
Giai điệu tình yêu
Giai điệu trái tim 
Giao thông với nụ cười
Giao ước tình yêu
Giá trị của yêu thương
Giá trị thật
Già néo đứt dây
Giải mã 
Giải mã - Bí mật hạnh phúc
Giải mã - Siêu mom siêu tám
Giải mã cặp đôi
Giải mã cơ thể - Inche Tamheomdae (Explorers Of The Human Body)
Giải mã cuộc sống
Giải mã đàn ông  
Giải mã kỳ tài 
Giải mã tình yêu 
Giải pháp sức khỏe
Giải thưởng truyền hình HTV
Giải trí hành động
Giải trí nước ngoài 
Giọng ải giọng ai I Can See You Voice 
Giọng ca bất bại 
Giọng ca bí ẩn
Giờ ăn vui nhộn
Giới thiệu ca khúc mới 
Giữ gìn nét xuân 
Góc bếp thông minh
 Góc cũ
Góc nhìn phụ nữ
Góc nhìn tuổi thơ
Góc nhỏ thanh xuân
Gõ cửa nhà sao
Gõ cửa thăm nhà
Gương hai chiều
Gương mặt phu thê
Gương soi phố phường
Hồ sơ trinh thám
Hai mùa mưa nắng 
Hát câu chuyện tình
Hát cho ngày mai - Mic On Debt Off  
Hát cùng mẹ yêu
Hát là vui - Vui là hát 
Hát mãi ước mơ
Hát với ngôi sao - ? (Thailand)
Hạt giống tâm hồn
Hãy hát cùng nhau 
Hàn Quốc tươi đẹp
Hàng ghế đầu
Hàng giả - Hàng thật
Hàng xóm lắm chiêu - Noisy Neighbors
Hành trang cuộc sống 
Hành trình kết nối những trái tim - Ainori (Love Ride)
Hành trình lột xác 
Hành trình lúc Bình minh
Hành trình theo chân Bác 
Hành trình qua các miền kinh đô 
Hành trình Trái Đất  
Hành trình xanh
Hay hay hên 
Hãy cùng làm cuộc sống tốt đẹp hơn
Hãy hỏi người biết hết 
Hãy là người tiêu dùng thông minh
Hẹn hò cùng ngôi sao
Hoa hướng dương
Hòa bình gọi
Hòa nhịp bạn trẻ
Hoạt hình Việt Nam 
 Học viện cải lương
Hỏi bác sĩ chuyên khoa
Hội ngộ bất ngờ - Ciao Darwin
Hội ngộ danh hài
Hội quán khôi hài 
Hợp đồng hôn nhân
HTV cùng giải Ngoại hạng Anh
HTV giải trí
HTV hôm nay
HTV7 thứ.... xem gì!
Hugo Safari
Huyền bí sông Hằng 
Huyền thoại biển Đông
Huyền thoại đường Trường Sơn 
Hương vị phố
Hương vị sống
Im lặng là vàng - The Noise  
IQ Tỏa sáng
Kể chuyện em nghe
Kết nối đến tương lai
Kết nối thị trường
Kết nối trái tim 
Khám phá
Khám phá 360
Khám phá Asean
Khám phá ẩm thực Việt Nam cùng Martin Yan
Khám phá cùng bé yêu  
Khám phá kiến trúc xanh
Khám phá sông Đà 
Khám phá Việt Nam cùng Robert Danhi
Khám phá vũ trụ
Khẩu vị ngôi sao 
Khéo tay hay làm
Khi chàng vào bếp
Khi mẹ vắng nhà
Khi ta 20
Khi vợ ra tay
Khi vợ vắng nhà
Khoa học - giáo dục
Khoa học ẩm thực
Khoa học với đời sống
Khoa học phát triển
Khoa học & tương lai
Khoa học với Tuổi trẻ
Khởi động ngày mới
Khoảnh khắc bất ngờ
Khoảnh khắc hiểm nguy - Emergency Minutes (นาทีฉุกเฉิน)
Khoảnh khắc kỳ diệu
Khoảnh khắc sinh tử
Khoảnh khắc vui nhộn
Khỏe & đẹp
Khỏe cùng bác sĩ
Khỏe đẹp 25 giờ 
Khỏe đẹp cùng Aerobic
Khỏe đẹp hoàn hảo
Khỏe đẹp hoàn hảo (2)
Khỏe đẹp hơn mỗi ngày
Khỏe đẹp toàn diện
Khôn lớn từng ngày
Không gian 777
Không gian cảm xúc
Không gian sống
Không hành lý
Khơi dậy tiềm năng trí tuệ trẻ
Khởi đầu ước mơ
Khởi động ngày mới
Khởi nghiệp
Khu phố vui vẻ
Khu rừng nhỏ - Little Forest
Khu vườn bí ẩn
Khuấy động nhịp đam mê - Karaoke Kings and Queens
Khúc hát se duyên - Sing Date 
Khuôn mặt đáng tin 
Kiến tạo nhịp cầu
Kiến thức dinh dưỡng
Kiến thức tiêu dùng
Kiến thức về động vật
Kiến trúc xưa và nay
Kiện cáo - cáo kiện
Kim tự tháp - Pyramid
Kinh tế tài chính
Kính đa tròng
Kịch thiếu nhi  
Khám phá cùng Khảo cổ học 
Ký sự 
Ký sự Amazon
Ký sự ASEAN
Ký sự bên dòng Mississippi 
Ký sự hỏa xa - Hành trình xuyên lục địa 
Ký sự khám phá dòng sông dài nhất Việt Nam - Sông Đồng Nai 
Ký sự Thăng Long ngàn năm thương nhớ  
Ký sự Thiên Đô 
Ký sự truyền hình (Cuộc sống và những điều kỳ diệu)
Bí kíp luyện ăn
Xe đạp ký
Ký ức bất ngờ
Kỳ nghỉ giữa tuần
Kỳ phùng địch thủ - Lip Sync Battle
Kỳ tài thách đấu - Ching Roy Ching Lan (Wow Wow Wow)
Là phái đẹp
Là vợ phải thế - Smart Wives
Lạc quan vui sống 
Lần theo dấu vết
Lệnh truy nã 
Lời chưa nói
Lời yêu thương HTV và bạn
Lớn nhanh con nhé
Lữ khách 24h 
Lựa chọn của tôi
Mái ấm gia đình Việt
Mái ấm thân yêu
Mảnh ghép tình yêu 
Mãi mãi thanh xuân
Mặt nạ ngôi sao - King Of Mask Singer / The Masked Singer
Mẹ chồng nàng dâu
Mẹ là nhất
Mẹ ơi con lên tivi
Mẹ ơi con muốn nói
Mẹ thiên nhiên thông thái
Mẹ vắng nhà, ba là siêu nhân - The Return of Superman 
Mẹ yêu con
Mình ăn trưa nhé
Mong đợi 1 ngày vui
Món ngon mỗi ngày 
Món ngon ở đâu cũng có
Món quà bất ngờ 
Mọi người cùng thắng - Every One Win'$
Mỗi ngày mỗi chuyện
Mỗi ngày một điều hay 
Một phút để chiến thắng - Minute To Win It
Một vốn
Mua gì, ở đâu?
Mùa hè trên nông trại khoai tây
Muôn mặt chuyện nghề
Muôn nẻo đường đời
MV cuối tuần
Nào ta cùng hát - Let's Sing Together (?)
Nào ta cùng vui
Năm ngón tay ngoan - Hi5
Năng động
Năng động du lịch Việt
Nét đẹp Việt
Nét xinh 
Ngạc nhiên chưa - Password
Ngại gì thử thách
Ngày ấy...Bây giờ 
Ngày của cha
Ngày của mẹ
Ngày may mắn 
Ngẫu hứng cùng sao
Nghề và nghiệp
Nghệ thuật kiến trúc
Nghệ thuật muôn màu
Nghệ sĩ thời COVID
Nghệ sĩ thử tài P336
Nghìn lẻ 1 chuyện
Nghìn lẻ 1 chuyện - 1001 Bí mật Eva  
Ngon khó cưỡng
Ngon miệng nhé bé yêu
Ngôi nhà âm nhạc - Star Academy (Operación Triunfo)
Ngôi nhà chung
Ngôi nhà mơ ước
Ngôi sao của bé
Ngôi sao của mẹ
 Ngôi sao hành động 
Ngôi sao tình yêu - The Love Machine
Ngôi sao về làng 
Ngôn ngữ trẻ thơ
Ngôn ngữ tuổi thơ
Nguồn dinh dưỡng quý báu
Nguồn sống mới
Người bí ẩn - Odd One In
Người cao tuổi
Người chồng trong mơ 
Người chiến thắng    - Pemenang ?
Người đẹp nhân ái
Người đi tìm chính mình
Người đi xuyên tường nhí - Hole In The Wall
Người đứng vững - Who's Still Standing?
Người hùng của những ngôi sao  
Người hùng tí hon - Pequeños Gigantes (Little Giants)
Người kế tiếp - Next One
Người kết nối
24 giờ thử yêu
Người lạ hiểu lòng tôi (from 20/3/2023)
Người phụ nữ thời đại  
Người truyền cảm hứng 
Người Việt bốn phương 
Người Việt hàng Việt
Nhà chung 
Nhà đất cuối tuần
Nhà đẹp
Nhà khoa học trẻ tuổi
Nhà vô địch nhí
Nhanh nào bé yêu
Nhanh như chớp - Lightning Quiz (Pritsana Fah Laep)
Nhạc hội quê hương
Nhạc hội song ca - Duet Song Festival 
Chia sẻ yêu thương cùng Nhạc hội song ca 
Nhảy đi ngại chi - Dancing With Myself
Nhật ký hạnh phúc 
Nhật ký không độ
Nhiệm vụ kỳ thú
Sao nhập học
Nhịp cầu âm nhạc
Nhịp cầu doanh nghiệp 
Nhịp cầu du học
Nhịp cầu vàng
Nhịp điệu trái tim
Nhịp phố
Nhịp sống khỏe
Nhịp sống sôi động
Nhịp sống thể thao
Nhịp sống trẻ
Nhiếp ảnh có gì đâu mà chảnh
Nhóc cưng siêu đẳng
Nhóc nhà mình - Easy to Raise a Kid?
Nhóm ca & Bạn trẻ
Nhỏ to cùng mẹ
Nhỏ to tâm sự
Nhu cầu cuộc sống 
Nhu cầu hạnh phúc
Những bài múa hay nhất
Những bí ẩn của cuộc sống 
Những bộ sưu tập độc đáo
Những báu vật của hành tinh xanh 
Những cánh chim không mỏi
Những câu chuyện kể bằng ánh sáng
Những chuyến phiêu lưu kỳ thú
Những điều kỳ thú
Những điều trông thấy
Những em bé thông minh
Những giải đáp từ cuộc sống
Những nẻo đường du ký
Những nẻo đường đất nước 
Những ngày đông ấm áp
Những ngày vui
Những người bạn nhỏ - ? (Đan Mạch)
Những người bạn hài hước
Những người bạn thông minh 
Những người bạn vui nhộn 
Những người thích đùa - Joker Family (ก็มาดิคร้าบ)
Những ông bố hoàn hảo
Những phát minh khoa học đáng nhớ
Những quyền năng bí ấn
Những siêu anh hùng
Những thám tử vui nhộn
Những thiên tài nhỏ
Những thiên thần nhỏ
Nơi tận cùng thế giới 
Nốt nhạc ngôi sao  
Nốt nhạc vui - Name That Tune  
Nuôi con khỏe
Nuôi con thông minh
Nụ cười ngày mới
Nụ cười tuổi thơ 
Nụ cười vàng
Nữ hoàng quyến rũ
Ô cửa trái tim
Ống kính hậu trường
Ở đây có tích cực
Ở nhà vui mà
P336 - Đào tạo nhóm nghệ sĩ toàn năng  
Phải lòng Đài Loan
Phái mạnh Việt
Phản ứng bất ngờ
Phiên bản hoàn hảo - Cover Star 
Phim giải trí thứ Bảy
Phim hay 11h   
Phim hoạt hình
Toon Disney 
Phim Nhật cuối tuần
Phim thiếu nhi 
Phim truyện tối thứ 3
Phim Việt cuối ngày
Phong cách người nổi tiếng
Phong cách sống
Phong cách trẻ
Phóng sự văn hóa
Phú Quý du ký 
Phút giây cảnh giác - Emergency Minutes (นาทีฉุกเฉิน)
Phụ huynh họp hội
Phụ nữ khỏe và đẹp
Phụ nữ & cuộc sống
Phụ nữ và hội nhập
Poli và các bạn
Quà tặng bất ngờ  
Quà tặng trái tim
Quà tặng tri thức
Quả ngọt trên những vùng quê
Quả táo đỏ
Quán ăn hạnh phúc
Quán lạ thành quen  
Quyền năng số 10 - Power Of 10
Quý cô hoàn hảo
Quý ông hoàn hảo - Mister Perfect
Quýt làm cam chịu
Rồng vàng - Who Wants to be a Millionaire
Ranh giới trắng đen
Robot Đại chiến  
Rock Việt 
Rung chuông vàng HTV
Running Man Hàn Quốc 
Running Man Việt Nam - Chơi là chạy
Sao có dám 
Sao hay chữ 
Sao hỏa Sao kim - Mars vs Venus
Sao - phải làm sao!
Sau ánh hào quang
Sao nhập ngũ
Sài Gòn tình ca
Sàn đấu ca từ  
Sàn đấu thời gian - The Money Pump
Sàn đấu vũ đạo - Hot Blood Dance Crew (China) 
Sản phẩm Việt Nam chất lượng cao
Sắc màu âm nhạc  
Sắc màu cuộc sống
Sân khấu về khuya 
Sành điệu cùng 9X
Sành điệu cùng Teen 
Seoul kỳ thú
Siêu bất ngờ - Turn Back  
Siêu hài Nhí - Little Big Gang 
Siêu quậy tí hon - ?  
Siêu sao đoán chữ - Match Game
Siêu tài năng nhí - Super 10 
Siêu thị may mắn - Supermarket Sweep
Sinh tồn nơi khắc nghiệt  
Sô diễn cuộc đời  
Sôi động sân cỏ 
Sống khỏe
Sống khỏe đời vui
Sống khỏe mỗi ngày
Sống lạc quan với bệnh tiểu đường 
Sống lâu sống khỏe
Sống nơi hoang dã
Sống trẻ
Sống tươi trẻ
Sống tươi trẻ mỗi ngày
Sống xanh
Stinky và Stomper
Studio #H9 – Hẹn cuối tuần
Studio số 6 - That's My Jam
Sức bật, sáng tạo & Khởi nghiệp
Sức sống diệu kỳ
Sức sống thanh xuân
Sức sống Việt Nam 
Sự cố bất ngờ 
Sự kiện thể thao
Sự lựa chọn của bạn
Sự lựa chọn hoàn hảo
Sự lựa chọn thông minh
Sự thật - Thật sự – Lies Allowed 
Taxi may mắn - Cash Cab
Tác giả tác phẩm
Tác giả - Tác phẩm - Ca sĩ 
Tài chính thị trường
Tài tám tếu
Tài tử cải lương
Tạp chí 888
Tạp chí chiến binh võ thuật
Tạp chí bóng đá Đức 
Tạp chí bóng đá thế giới
Tạp chí bóng rổ
Tạp chí bóng rổ FIBA
Tạp chí người mẫu
Tạp chí quyền anh
Tạp chí sức khỏe
Tạp chí văn nghệ
 Anh tài đường phố
 Bác sĩ nói gì ?
 Bản sao hoàn hảo
  Chuyện công sở
 Chuyện đời tôi
 Chuyện hậu trường 
 Cuộc sống và những điều kỳ diệu
 Danh nhân đất Việt
 Diễn đàn văn hóa nghệ thuật
 Dọc đường đất nước 
Đi tìm ẩn số - Miljoenenjacht - Deal or no Deal 
  Đọc nhanh
  Em đẹp
  Ghi nhanh
  Hộp thư 
 Kính đa tròng
  Ký ức Sài Gòn - Thành phố Hồ Chí Minh
  Kỷ lục Việt Nam
  Mỗi tuần một nhân vật
 Nét đẹp Sài Gòn
 Nghệ thuật và cuộc sống
 Nhịp điệu giải trí
Phim ngắn cuối tuần
 Phim tài liệu
Phim 4:3
 Phim truyện
 Phóng sự truyền hình
 Sắc màu thành phố
Tác giả tác phẩm
Tác phẩm văn học 
 Tiểu phẩm 
Vén màn bí ẩn
Xin chào bác tài
Yểu điệu thục nữ
Tặng em một bản tình ca
Tâm đầu ý hợp - The Newlywed Game  
Tâm hồn Việt
Tầm nhìn thương hiệu
Tần số tình yêu 
Tần số 15
Tập kết
Tập làm chiến sĩ
Tập thể dục
Tết nay ăn gì 
Tết này tôi ước
Thai kỳ khỏe mạnh 
Thay đổi góc nhìn
Thay lời muốn nói
Thách thức danh hài - Crack Them Up (Рассмеши комика)
Thám tử hôn nhân 
Thám tử tình yêu
Thách là chơi
Thách sao nấu được 
Thanh âm quyền năng 
Thảnh thơi cuối tuần
Thảnh thơi vui sống
Thắp sáng những niềm tin
Thắp sáng niềm tin
Thần tượng Âm nhạc - Vietnam Idol 
Thần tượng bóng rổ  
Thần tượng tuổi 300 
Thần tượng tương lai
Thập toàn thập mỹ
Thấu tình đạt lý 
Theo dấu những bài ca
Thế giới 24 giờ
Thế giới 24/7
Thế giới bóng đá
Thế giới diệu kỳ
Thế giới điện ảnh
Thế giới đó đây
Thế giới hoang dã
Thế giới mẹ và bé
Thế giới muôn loài
Thế giới ngày qua
Thế giới thể thao 
Thế giới tuổi teen 
Thế giới tuổi thơ 
Thế giới vui nhộn - Super Trio
Thế giới xanh 
Thể dục 5 phút trước khi ngủ 
Thể dục buổi sáng
Thể dục Aerobic
Thể thao là cuộc sống
Thể thao & đời sống
Thể thao nhân vật và sự kiện
Thể thao sáng thứ 7
Thiên đường ẩm thực - The King Of Food 
Thị trường 365
Thông điệp sáng tạo 
Thông điệp thời gian
Thông điệp yêu thương
Thông gia song đấu 
Thông tin Văn hóa - Khoa học Kỹ thuật
Thời tiết và cuộc sống
Thời tới rồi - First and Last (UK)
Thời trang - Đời sống
Thời trang & Nhân vật
Thời trang và cuộc sống
Thủ lĩnh thanh niên (?) 
Thư giãn 12 giờ
Thư giãn cuối tuần 
Thử tài người hâm mộ
Thử tài thách trí - Gra W Ciemno (Clueless)
Thử tài thông minh
Thử thách - BOXI 
Thử thách 99 giây cùng Quyền Linh
Thử thách cùng bước nhảy - So You Think You Can Dance  
Liên hoan Tài năng cùng bước nhảy
Thử thách địa hình 
Thử thách lớn khôn 
Thực khách vui vẻ
Thực phẩm tốt - Cuộc sống tốt 
Thường thức
Thường thức gia đình
Tiếng cười sinh viên
Tiếng hát mãi xanh
Tiếng rao 4.0
Tiếp chiêu đi chờ chi - 暖心收官 (China)
Tiếu lâm bách nghệ
Tiếu lâm nhạc hội
Tí hon tranh tài
Tích tắc tích tắc
Tìm bạn tâm giao
Tìm người bí ẩn - Dirty Rotten Cheater
Tìm người thông minh - Brainiest Kid 
Tin buổi chiều
Tin cuối ngày
Tin đầu giờ 
Tin thế giới (19h50)
Tin thể thao
Tin trong nước
Tin Dự báo thời tiết
Tình khúc giao mùa
Tình làng nghĩa xóm 
Tình trăm năm  
Tình yêu của mẹ
Tình yêu hoàn mỹ - Perfect Dating 
Tình yêu muôn mặt
Tỏ tình hoàn mỹ   
Tỏa sáng giữa đời thường
Tôi chọn hạnh phúc 
Tôi chưa tùng 
Tôi có thể - I Can Do That
Tôi là người chiến thắng - The Winner Is...
Tôi là người dẫn đầu  
Tôi tuổi Teen 
Tôi và chúng ta
Tôn trọng - Thư giãn & Trách nhiệm
Tổ ấm đẹp xinh
Tổ ấm hạnh phúc
Tổ ấm yêu thương
Trăng mật diệu kỳ
Trên dòng thời gian
Trải nghiệm xuân
Trí khôn ta đây
Trinh sát kể chuyện
Trong nhà ngoài phố 
Trong sáng cùng tiếng Việt
Trong thế giới xe
Trò chuyện cuối tuần
Trốn đâu cho thoát (from 5.4.2023)
Trở lại Volga
Trúc xanh
Truyền hình thanh niên
Tuổi trẻ hôm nay
Tuyệt chiêu siêu diễn - Lip Sync Ultimate
Tuyệt đỉnh tề gia
Tuyệt đỉnh tranh tài - Stjernekamp (The Ultimate Entertainer)
Tự mình làm lấy
Từ bốn phương trời 
Từ nhà ra phố
Tự hào chất lượng Việt
Tự tin để đẹp
Tự tình quê hương 
Úm ba la ra chữ 
Ước mơ của em
Ước mơ đến trường 
Ước mơ trong tầm tay
Ước mơ xanh
Ước mơ bốn bể là nhà
Và tôi vẫn hát
Văn hóa ẩm thực
Văn hóa doanh nghiệp 
Văn nghệ quần chúng
Văn nghệ mẫu giáo
Văn nghệ thiếu nhi
Vấn đề thể thao trong tuần 
Vận động trường
Vẻ đẹp hoang dã
Vẽ tiếp cầu vồng
Về phía mặt trời
Về trường - Let's Go To School 
Vệ sinh an toàn thực phẩm 
Việc làm 
Việt Nam - 54 dân tộc anh em 
Việt Nam - đi là ghiền
Việt Nam du ký
Việt Nam du ký (2) 
Việt Nam đất nước tôi yêu
Việt Nam những nụ cười
Việt Nam trong trái tim tôi (contest create music)
Vì con yêu
Vì chất lượng cuộc sống
Vì cuộc sống bình yên
Vì cuộc sống cộng đồng
Vì một thế giới xanh
Vì ngày mai tươi sáng
Vì sức khỏe trẻ em
Vì tuổi thơ
Vì yêu mà đến - Perfect Dating
Vitamin xanh
Vị trí xứng đáng (comming soon)
Vòng nguyệt quế
Vô lăng tình yêu
Vợ chồng son - Shinkon-san Irasshai
Vua phạt đền - Kick Hero
Vui ca đoán giọng
Vui cùng bước nhảy
Vui cùng Hoa lúa
Vui cùng Hugo - Hugo
Vui để học
Vui học Tiếng Anh
Vui khỏe cùng HTV
Vui khúc đồng dao
Vui là chính  - Just for Laughs
Vùng đất trái tim
Vũ điệu tuổi xanh - Baby Ballroom
Vũ điệu vàng 
Vừa đi vừa hát 
Vườn sao mai
Vượt lên chính mình -  ปลดหนี้
Vượt qua những nỗi sợ 
Vừng ơi mở cửa - Raid The Cage
Xanh tươi mỗi ngày 
Xả Stress
Xả xì chét
Xây dựng thương hiệu mạnh
Xe và xu hướng
Xin chào bút chì 
Xóm đụng chuyện 
Xóm trọ độc nhất 
Xu hướng và phong cách
Xu thế trẻ 
Xuân, Hạ, Thu, Đông, rồi lại Xuân
Xúc xắc xúc xẻ
Xưởng thiết kế của Jimi
Yêu là chọn
Yêu là cưới
Yoga cho tất cả mọi người
Yoga và cuộc sống  
Ý phái đẹp - Lời phái mạnh
Ý tưởng xanh

HTV9

1 giờ hoán đổi
10 phút tiếp dân
40 tuần hạnh phúc
45 phút
60 giây
123 Ha 
180° xanh
365° thể thao 
1001 chuyện
1001 chuyện bất ngờ
A bạn đây rồi
Ai hiểu mẹ nhất?
Alo bác sĩ nghe
Alo bác sĩ nhi đồng
Alo MR Cảnh báo
An cư lạc nghiệp
An ninh Thành phố Hồ Chí Minh
An ninh trật tự trong tuần
An ninh và cuộc sống 
An toàn giao thông
An toàn thực phẩm
Asia Top band 
Ăn sạch sống khỏe
Âm sắc Việt
Ẩm thực Việt Nam
Bà mối hẹn hò
Barney và các bạn
Bác Ba Phi thời @
Bác sĩ của bạn
Bác sĩ Enter
Bác sĩ nói gì
Bản lĩnh đối mặt 
Bản sắc Việt
Bản tin trưa (11h30)
Kết nối
Bản tin trưa (12h00)
Góc thông tin  
Bạn cần biết
Bạn chọn nghề nào?
Bạn có biết 
Bạn có biết vì sao
Bạn trẻ bốn phương
Bật mí chuyện sao
Bật mí phim truyền hình
Bếp 8
Bếp ngọt
Bí mật các loài hoa
Biên cương và Hải đảo
Biên giới và hải đảo 
Biên phòng
Biệt đội phấn trắng 
Biệt đội thông thái  
Bình luận âm nhạc
Bình thơ
Bố là tất cả  
Bộ đôi thông thái
Búp măng non
Búp sen xanh 
Camera cận cảnh
Camera thành phố 
Ca cảnh cải lương 
Ca cổ
Ca hát mẫu giáo
Ca nhạc dân tộc
Ca nhạc yêu cầu
Cà phê TEK
Cà phê Việt Nam
Cà tun cà tun
Cải cách hành chính
Cảnh báo an toàn sống 
Cẩm nang du lịch 
Cẩm nang phòng chống Covid tại nhà
Câu chuyện cảnh sát
Câu chuyện giáo dục
Câu chuyện giao thông
Câu chuyện hàng Việt
Câu chuyện hàng Việt: Người bán hàng số 1
 Câu chuyện hàng Việt: Vui cùng nhà nông
Câu chuyện kinh doanh
Câu chuyện quê hương
Câu chuyện thể thao 
Câu chuyện thiếu nhi
Câu chuyện truyền hình
Câu chuyện từ trái tim
Câu chuyện ước mơ
Câu lạc bộ âm nhạc dân tộc 
Câu lạc bộ thể thao 
Cầu nối
Cầu vồng đa sắc 
Cầu vồng xanh
Chân dung nhạc sĩ
Chèo 
Chia sẻ bệnh án
Chìa khóa vàng 
Chiếc thìa vàng
Chinh phục đỉnh Everest
Chính sách và đời sống
Chồi xinh 
Chung tay vì cộng đồng
Chuông vàng vọng cổ
Chuyên đề an toàn thực phẩm 
Chuyên đề âm nhạc
Chuyên gia dinh dưỡng 
Chuyên mục văn hóa
Chuyến xe âm nhạc 
Chuyển động 4.0
Chuyển động âm nhạc
Chuyển động kinh doanh
Chuyển động ngày mới
Chuyện 4 mùa
Chuyện bốn phương 
Chuyện 12 giờ
Chuyện cảnh giác
Chuyện của phố
Chuyện Đông chuyện Tây
Chuyện đời chuyện người
Chuyện đời thường
Chuyện gì xảy ra?
Chuyện khó tin
Khó tin và sự thật 
Tin khó tin
Lật tẩy  
Chuyện lạ bốn phương
Chuyện ngày xưa
Chuyện người khởi nghiệp
Chuyện nhỏ mà không nhỏ
Chuyện trưa
Chuyện trưa 12 giờ
Chuyện từ những con đường
Chương trình 1001
Chương trình 12G
Chương trình chống bạo hành trong gia đình
Chương trình dạy nhạc
Chương trình đặc sắc của HTV
Chương trình Lực lượng vũ trang 
Chứng khoán 24h 
Cine chủ nhật
CLB Khoa học trẻ
CLB Tiếng hát Truyền hình
Có hẹn với HTVC
Có hẹn lúc 22 giờ
Con người và tự nhiên
Công dân và Pháp luật
Công đoàn thành phố
Công nghệ thông tin
Công nghệ xanh
Công nghiệp hóa - Hiện đại hóa đất nước 
Công nhân & công đoàn
Cộng đồng sáng tạo
Cơ hội cho bệnh nhân nghèo 
Cung đàn yêu thương
Cùng bạn đến trường
Cùng Heineken trải nghiệm quần vợt đỉnh cao
Cùng học vẽ 
Cùng nhà nông làm giàu
Cùng xây ngôi nhà mơ ước
Cùng xây ước mơ
Cuộc phiêu lưu kỳ thú 
Cuộc sống bừng sáng
Cuộc sống mới 
Cuộc sống quanh ta (sau Dự báo thời tiết 19h45)
Cuộc sống quanh ta 
Cuộc sống và những điều kỳ diệu 
Bí kíp luyện ăn
Sứ dưỡng sinh - Hướng đến sức khỏe cộng đồng  
Xe đạp kỳ thú
Cuộc sống xanh
Cười gần cười xa
Dạy tiếng Anh 
Dạy tiếng Pháp  
Dân hỏi, chính quyền trả lời 
Dân số phát triển
Dân số và môi trường
Dân vận khéo
Dấu ấn thiên niên kỷ
Dấu ấn thời gian
Dấu hỏi từ cuộc sống
Di sản thế giới
Diễn đàn kinh tế
Diễn đàn nghệ thuật & truyền hình
Diễn đàn nhà quản lý
Dinh dưỡng và sức khỏe
Doanh nghiệp & hội nhập
Doanh nghiệp vì cộng đồng
Doanh nhân và Thương hiệu
Doanh nhân vì cộng đồng 
Du hành ký ức
Du ký cùng hoa hậu
Du lịch và Cuộc sống 
Du lịch vòng quanh thế giới
Duyên dáng ASEAN
Duyên dáng truyền hình
Duyên dáng truyền hình ASEAN
Dưới ánh đèn sân khấu
Dự báo kinh tế
Dự báo thời tiết
Dự báo thời tiết: Đất nước & con người
Đại sứ hàng Việt
Đảng và cuộc sống
Đặc nhiệm Blouse trắng 
Đất nước - Con người
Đất nước mến yêu
Đào tạo quản trị mạng 
Đèn xanh đèn đỏ
Đẹp 9 khỏe 10 
8 khỏe đẹp 
Xem mà cảnh giác 
Thị trường 24h 
Tiêu dùng thông minh 
Đẹp để tự tin
Đẹp và phong cách  
Để cuộc sống mãi xanh
Để đó vợ lo
Để Thành phố Văn minh hiện đại
Đi an toàn - Về hạnh phúc
Đi bốn phương 
Đi cùng con
Đi khắp 4 phương
Điểm hẹn quê hương 
Điểm tin bóng đá (Anh, Đức, Pháp...)
Điều gì đã xảy ra
Điệu lý quê em
Đón đầu nguy hiểm
Đờn ca tri kỷ
Đố em
Đối thoại mỗi ngày
Đồng hành hàng Việt
Đồng hành cùng nhạc sĩ 
Đua tài ẩm thực
Đường kim mũi chỉ
Em nuôi heo đất
Em yêu khoa học
Én vàng Học đường
Én vàng Nghệ sĩ
Én vàng - Người dẫn chương trình truyền hình
 Én xuân
Fan hâm mộ
Gặp gỡ & đối thoại
Ghép đôi thần tốc
Ghi nhanh
Giáo dục và hướng nghiệp
Gia đình tài tử
Gia đình và xã hội
Giấc mơ điện ảnh
Giai điệu bốn phương
Giai điệu tình thương 
Giai điệu trái tim
Giao lưu văn nghệ
Giải thưởng truyền hình HTV
Giải trí nước ngoài
Giọng ca vàng ASEAN
Giọt nắng phù sa
Giờ thứ 9
Gõ cửa âm nhạc
Gõ cửa thăm nhà
Góc cũ
Góc luật sư
Góc nhìn HTV
Góc nhìn khởi nghiệp
Góc nhìn Việt Nam
Góc phố
Gương mặt điện ảnh
Gương mặt truyền hình
Gương sáng phố phường
Hát về thời hoa đỏ
Hàng Việt đổi mới sáng tạo
Hàng Việt sáng tạo hội nhập
Hành trình âm nhạc
Hành trình ẩm thực Việt Nam
Hành trình năng lượng đổi mới quê hương 
Hành trình yêu thương
Hà Nội ngày nay
Hành trình phố xanh
Hành trình Trái Đất 
Hào khí Thăng Long
Hạnh phúc đến mọi nhà
Hãy đoán đi
Hãy là bé ngoan
Hãy là số 1
Hãy làm con chúng ta hạnh phúc
Hậu trường nghệ thuật
Hiểu về trái tim
Hoa cuộc sống
Hoa tay
Hoa tay thông thái
Hòa bình gọi
Hòa nhịp bạn trẻ
Hóa giải tài tình
Hoạt cảnh thiếu nhi
Hóng chuyện Showbiz
Họ đã làm điều đó như thế nào?
Học Bác hôm nay
Học tập và làm theo tấm gương đạo đức Hồ Chí Minh
Hô biến 
Hội nhập và Phát triển
Hộp thư âm nhạc
Hộp thư bạn xem đài
Hộp thư sân khấu
Hộp thư sức khỏe 
Hộp thư truyền hình
HTV Challenger Cup - Thử thách địa hình 
HTV đầu giờ
HTV giải trí
HTV hôm nay
HTV - Thành phố tình ca
HTV tôi kể 
HTV Xin chào!
Hương bếp Việt
Hướng đến công nghiệp bền vững
Kể chuyện 
Kế hoạch gia đình hạnh phúc - Happy Family Plan
Kết nối không giới hạn
Kết nối đến tương lai
Kết nối & chia sẻ
Kết nối và sẻ chia
Kết nối yêu thương
Khách mời HTV - Diễn đàn doanh nghiệp 
Khai mở quá khứ
Khám phá
Khám phá 360
Khám phá thành phố trẻ
Khám phá Việt Nam cùng Martin Yan
Khéo tay hay làm
Khoa học nông nghiệp
Khoa học & Tương lai
Khoa học và đời sống
Khoa học và sản xuất
Khoảnh khắc cuộc đời
Khoảnh khắc kỳ diệu
Khỏe đẹp mỗi ngày
Khỏe và đẹp
Không gian sống
Khởi đầu mới
Khởi nghiệp 
Khởi nghiệp cùng Coop
Khu chợ vui vẻ
Kim tự tháp
Kiến thức cuộc sống
Kiến thức kinh tế 
Kiến thức pháp luật
Kiến thức phổ thông 
Kiến thức tiêu dùng
Kinh tế cuối tuần
Kinh tế tài chính 24G
Kinh tế tài chính
Kinh tế tài chính cuối tuần
Kỹ năng tiêu dùng
Kỳ lân và cô tiên thợ 
Ký sự Thăng Long - Ngàn năm thương nhớ
La cà phố 
Lao động và việc làm
Lao động xã hội
Làng biển Việt Nam
Làng quê trong tôi
Lắng nghe hạnh phúc
Lắng nghe và trao đổi
Lời hay ý đẹp
Lời yêu thương HTV và Bạn
Lửa khởi nghiệp
Lựa chọn của tôi 
Lựa chọn thông minh
Lý luận, phê bình văn học nghệ thuật Thành phố Hồ Chí Minh 
Mái trường mến yêu
Mạng truyền thông
Mẹ chồng nàng dâu
Mẹ khỏe bé thông minh
Miền ký ức 
Món ngon quê Việt
Môi trường và cuộc sống
Mỗi ngày một bí quyết
Mỗi ngày mỗi chuyện
Mỗi ngày một điều hay
Mốt và cuộc sống
Một ngày của Phúc Mập
Mở cửa tương lai
Muôn màu thể thao
Muôn mặt cuộc sống
Muôn nẻo đường đời
Mỹ nhân vào bếp
Mỹ vị bốn phương 
Năng động khỏe và đẹp
Năng lượng xanh 
Name That Toon 
Nào ta cùng vui
Ngày chủ nhật của em
Ngày cuối tuần của chúng tôi
Ngày mới nắng lên
Ngẫm...cười
Ngân mãi chuông vàng
Nghề của bạn
Nghệ sĩ và công chúng
Nghệ sĩ và Sàn diễn
Nghệ thuật kiến trúc
Nghệ thuật và cuộc sống
Ngon bá chấy
Ngôi sao ngày mai
Ngôi sao tiếng hát truyền hình
Ngụ ngôn thiếu nhi
Nguồn dinh dưỡng quý báu  
Nguồn sáng phương Nam
Người dẫn chương trình tương lai
Người kết nối 
Người thành phố quan tâm
Người tiêu dùng sành điệu
Người tốt việc tốt
Người trong cuộc
Người truyền cảm hứng
Người kết nối
Người Việt Nam - Hàng Việt Nam
Nhà bao việc
Nhà toán học trẻ tuổi
Nhân đạo xã hội
Nhật Bản độc đáo
Nhật ký Blouse trắng
Nhật ký hạnh phúc
Nhật ký không độ
Nhật ký tuổi hoa
Nhìn ra thế giới
Nhìn ra thế giới 
Nhịp cầu doanh nhân
Nhịp cầu du học
Nhịp cầu kinh doanh
Nhịp cầu quê hương
Nhịp đập thành phố trẻ
Nhịp đập thể thao
Nhịp điệu nắng mai
Nhịp phố
Nhịp sống kinh doanh
Nhịp sống Sài Gòn
Nhịp sống thể thao
Những bài hát chúng em ưa thích
Những bông hoa nhỏ
Những cánh chim không mỏi
Những câu chuyện đẹp
Những cung bậc thi ca
Những cư dân hiện đại 
Những dòng sông quê hương
Những điều kỳ thú 
Những giải đáp từ cuộc sống
Những hộp quà xinh
Những khoảnh khắc của thiên nhiên
Những kỷ lục Guinness thế giới
Những miền đất yêu thương 
Những ngày vui
Những ngôi sao thầm lặng
Những phát minh khoa học đáng nhớ 
Những tấm gương thầm lặng 
Những thám tử vui nhộn
Những vòng tay nhân ái
Những ý tưởng thông minh
Những ý tưởng toàn cầu 
Niềm tin gửi lại
Nói chuyện chuyên đề 
Nói và làm
Nỗ lực vì sự sinh tồn
Nông nghiệp nông thôn
Nông nghiệp trong tuần 
Nông nghiệp tuần qua
Nông nghiệp hiện đại - Nông thôn văn minh
Nông sản Việt
Nông thôn hôm nay
Nông thôn ngày nay
Nối bước đến trường
Nối kết yêu thương
Nối nhịp trái tim
Nơi yêu thương bắt đầu 
Nơi yêu thương ở lại
Ở nhà hát ca
Ống kính thể thao
Ống kinh công nghệ
Ống nhòm nhí
Phát triển bền vững
Phát triển đô thị
Phi đội không tuổi
Phía sau quả bóng cam 
Phim cuối tuần HTV9
Phim tài liệu
Phim tài liệu khoa học
Phim hoạt hình
Phim truyện buổi sáng
Phim truyện cải lương
Phim truyện cuối ngày
Phim truyện cuối tuần
Phim truyện Thanh thiếu niên
Phim truyện về khuya
Phim Việt chiều chủ nhật
Phong cách
Phong cách và Đam mê
Phóng sự
Phóng sự điều tra
Phóng sự tài liệu
Phóng sự thể thao
Phóng sự thời sự
Phòng cháy chữa cháy
Phụ nữ
Phụ nữ hiện đại
Phụ nữ và Cuộc sống
Quả ngọt trên những vùng quê
Quán quen chuyện chất
Quy luật tất yếu
Quý cô thông thái 
Quốc phòng toàn dân
Quyền trẻ em
Quý bà giỏi giang
Ra khơi
Rác - Chuyện không nhỏ 
Radio cảm xúc
Rồng vàng
Rạng ngời trang sử Việt
Sáng mãi đạo đức Hồ Chí Minh
Sáng tạo trẻ
Sáng tạo Việt
Sài Gòn hôm nay
Sao kim
Sao tiểu thương Việt
Sao tìm sao 
Sắc màu âm nhạc
Sắc màu cuộc sống
Sắc màu cuộc sống (2)
Sắc màu điện ảnh
Sắc màu giải trí
Sắc màu tình yêu
Sân khấu
Sân khấu chuyên đề
Sân khấu đầu tiên
Sân khấu thiếu nhi
Sân khấu về khuya
Siêu nhí đấu trí  
Siêu thị cười
Sinh tố 7 màu
Son môi đỏ 
Sổ tay nội trợ 
Sống
Sống để yêu thương
Sống khỏe mỗi ngày
Sống làm việc theo pháp luật
Sống vui sống khỏe
Sống xanh
Studio mộc
Sự kiện thể thao
Sự kiện thể thao trong tuần 
Sự lựa chọn thông minh
Sức bật, sáng tạo và khởi nghiệp
Sức khỏe cho mọi người
Sức khỏe là vàng
Sức khỏe vàng
Tác giả tác phẩm
Tài chính kinh doanh
Tài chính ngân hàng
Tài chính - Thị trường cuối tuần
Tài chính toàn cầu
Tài tử cài lương
Tái sinh - Reborn
Tam nông
Tản mạn cuối tuần
Tạp chí 360
Tạp chí bí quyết đẹp
Tạp chí bóng rổ
Tạp chí công nghệ thông tin
Tạp chí đầu tư & phát triển  
Tạp chí đầu tư tiếp thị  
Tạp chí giáo dục 
Tạp chí giáo dục quốc phòng toàn dân 
Tạp chí khỏe và đẹp 
Tạp chí Kiến thức Kinh tế
Tạp chí kinh tế cuối tuần
Tạp chí phong cách
Tạp chí sức khỏe
Tạp chí thị trường
Tạp chí Văn hóa nghệ thuật Thế giới
Tạp chí văn nghệ
Tạp chí văn nghệ: Chuyện đời tôi
Tạp chí văn nghệ: Chuyện hậu trường 
Tạp chí văn nghệ: Cuộc sống và những điều kỳ diệu
Tạp chí văn nghệ: Danh nhân đất Việt
Tạp chí văn nghệ: Diễn dàn văn hóa nghệ thuật
Tạp chí văn nghệ: Dọc đường đất nước  
Tạp chí văn nghệ: Đọc nhanh
Tạp chí văn nghệ: Ghi nhanh
Tạp chí văn nghệ: Hộp thư
Tạp chí văn nghệ: Kính đa tròng
Tạp chí văn nghệ: Kỷ lục Việt Nam
Tạp chí văn nghệ: Mỗi tuần một nhân vật
Tạp chí văn nghệ: Nét đẹp Sài Gòn
Tạp chí văn nghệ: Nghệ thuật và cuộc sống
Tạp chí văn nghệ: Nhịp điệu giải trí
Tạp chí văn nghệ: Phóng sự truyền hình
Tạp chí văn nghệ: Sắc màu thành phố
Tạp chí văn nghệ: Tiểu phẩm
Tâm điểm hôm nay
Buổi chiều tốt lành
Đẹp 9 khỏe 10 
Ghế nóng
Tin khó tin
Thật giả
Tâm điểm khỏe đẹp 
Tâm hồn cao thượng 
Tâm sáng để vươn xa
Tâm tình bỉm sữa
Tấm thẻ sẻ chia
Tập mà chơi - Chơi mà tập
Tết làm điều hay
Tham vấn chuyên gia 
Thần tượng âm nhạc Châu Á
Thần tượng âm nhạc Việt Nam - Vietnam Idol
Thanh âm ngày mới 
Thanh xuân tôi
Thanh xuân tỏa sáng
Thay lời muốn nói
Thành phố 24G
Thành phố của tôi 
Thành phố hôm nay 
Thành phố tôi yêu
Thế giới 24/7
Thế giới 24G
Thế giới 24G: Tổng hợp sự kiện thế giới năm
Thế giới âm nhạc
Thế giới công nghệ
Thế giới đó đây
Thế giới giải trí
Thế giới mẹ & bé
Thế giới muôn màu
Thế giới thể thao
Thế giới tuổi thơ
Thế giới võ thuật 
Thế giới xanh
Thể dục 5 phút 
Thể dục buổi sáng
Thể thao 365
Thử thách cùng HTV
Vui khỏe cùng HTV
Thể thao là cuộc sống
Thể thao quốc tế tổng hợp 
Thể thao ngày mới
Thể thao tổng hợp 
Thể thao tổng hợp trong tuần
Thi đua yêu nước
Thị trường chứng khoán
Thị trường hôm nay 
Thiên nhiên hoang dã
Thông tin kinh tế
Thông tin dân sự
Thông tin dân sự - rao vặt
Thông tin giá cả thị trường (?) 
Thông tin Văn hóa - Khoa học - Kỹ thuật
Thơ
Thơ ca giao hòa
Thời tiết & cuộc sống
Thời sự âm nhạc
Thời sự HTV
Thời sự nông nghiệp 
Thời tiết du ký
Thủy sản & hội nhập
Thương trường muôn mặt
Thử thách bất ngờ  
Thử thách vui vẻ
Thường thức
Thường thức gia đình
Tích tắc
Tiêu điểm y tế
Tiến tới dân giàu nước mạnh 
Tiếng Anh thương mại
Tiếng ca học đường
Tiếng đàn tri âm
Tiếng hát truyền hình
Tiếng hát măng non Truyền hình 
Tiếng nói thể thao thành phố
Tiếp sức người thầy
Tiêu dùng hiện đại 
Tiêu điểm HTVC
Tìm hiểu âm nhạc
Tìm hiểu nghệ thuật âm nhạc
Tìm kiếm tri thức
Tin buổi sáng
 Cuộc sống quanh ta
 Điểm báo
 Điểm báo cuối tuần
 Đối thoại mỗi ngày
  Giải trí
 Giá cả thị trường 
 Góc thông tin
 Góc nhìn Việt Nam
 Sự kiện & vấn đề
 Tin thế giới
 Thế giới 
 Thể thao
 Thị trường thành phố
 Thông tin đường dây nóng
Thông tin công cộng 
Nhìn ra thế giới
Vui khỏe mỗi ngày
Tin cuối ngày
Tin đầu giờ
Tin học cho mọi người
Tin thế giới
Tin tiếng nước ngoài
News (Tiếng Anh)
Le Petit Journal (Tiếng Pháp)
外语新闻 (Tiếng Trung) 
Tin trong nước
Tiêu điểm 247
Tình khúc xưa và nay
Tỏa sáng giữa đời thường 
Toả sáng ước mơ
Tọa đàm văn hóa Thành phố
Toàn dân phòng cháy chữa cháy
Tôi và chúng ta
Tổng hợp cuối tuần
Trà sữa 10+
Trật tự an toàn giao thông
Trật tự kỷ cương - Nếp sống văn minh đô thị
Trật tự văn minh đô thị
Trên dòng thời gian
Trên đường hội nhập
Trên đường thiên lý
Trinh sát kể chuyện
Trò chuyện cuối tuần
Trong nhà ngoài phố
Trong thế giới xe
Truyền hình Công nhân - Công đoàn 
Truyền hình Quân khu 7
Truyền hình Thanh niên
Tuổi hoàng hôn
Tuổi nắng hồng
Tuổi trăng tròn
Tuổi trẻ hôm nay
Tuổi trẻ khởi nghiệp 
Tuổi trẻ ngày nay
Từ bốn phương trời
Từ lý luận đến thực tiễn
Tự giới thiệu 
Tự hào hàng Việt Nam
Tự hào thương hiệu quốc gia
Tự hào thương hiệu Việt Nam
Tự hào tổ quốc Việt Nam
Ước mơ đến trường
Ước mơ từ làng 
Văn hóa doanh nghiệp  
Văn hóa Thành phố Hồ Chí Minh
Văn hóa và những người bạn
Văn minh đô thị
Văn nghệ quần chúng
Văn nghệ thiếu nhi 
Vấn đề thể thao trong tuần
Vấn đề trong tuần 
Vầng trăng cổ nhạc
Về nhà đi anh
Vệ sinh an toàn thực phẩm
Việt Nam trong trái tim tôi (contest create music)
Việt Nam tươi đẹp 
Vì an toàn cuộc sống 
Vì bình yên cuộc sống
Vì chất lượng cuộc sống
Vì cuộc sống mai sau
Vì cuộc sống xanh
Vì ngày mai tươi sáng
Vì thành phố đáng sống
Vì thành phố văn minh và phát triển 
Vì tuổi thơ
Video clip của bạn
Vợ chồng mình hát 
Vua bếp
Vui cùng con cháu
Vui khúc đồng dao 
Vững bước tương lai
Vườn âm nhạc
Xây dựng đảng
Xanh vườn tốt ruộng
Xin chào cuộc sống
Xu thế trẻ
Y tế học đường 
Yêu thương cuộc sống
Yoga ngày mới

HTV Co.op

Shopping channels
Phim truyện Việt Nam

HTV Thể thao (HTVC Thể thao)

Bóng tròn HTV
Câu lạc bộ thể thao
Cầu thủ thứ 12
Điểm tin bóng đá
HTV Cùng giải Ngoại hạng Anh
Nhật ký thể thao
Nhịp đập thể thao
Nhịp sống thể thao
Sôi động sân cỏ
Tường thuật bóng đá
Tường thuật thể thao
Tạp chí bóng đá Anh
Tạp chí quần vợt
Tạp chí võ thuật
Thể thao là cuộc sống
Thế giới thể thao
Huyền thoại bóng đá thế giới
Tạp chí tinh thần võ thuật
Khỏe đẹp
Bản tin sáng, Bản tin trưa
Game 4 TV

HTVC

HTVC Phụ Nữ
Góc hàn huyên
Giữ lấy mầm sống 
Yoga cho mọi người  
Chân dung phụ nữ  
Phụ nữ cuộc sống
Cẩm nang mua sắm
Làng ẩm thực
Thiên nga vượt sóng
Ngày mới nắng lên
Đời đẹp lắm 
Tâm điểm 247
Tổ ấm hạnh phúc
Du lịch 5 châu
Mẹ và bé

HTVC Thuần Việt

Bước ra ánh sáng - Come Out
Caro - ca nhạc
Chuyện về những vở diễn một thời 
Chuyện cảnh giác
Đất Việt mến yêu
Đông Tây nam bắc
Đời nghệ sĩ
Đường đến danh ca vọng cổ 
Hẹn ăn trưa
HTVC Highlight 
Ký ức tươi đẹp
Mảnh ghép vui nhộn
Mỗi tuần 1 nhân vật
Nghệ thuật và cuộc sống
Phụ nữ quyền năng
Sống thật
Talkshow 
Tạp chí văn nghệ
Tâm điểm 247
Thử thách dân hài 
Tiêu điểm HTVC
Thương vụ tí hon

HTVC Gia Đình

Chung một mái nhà
Sưởi ấm gia đình
Chuyện lạ đó đây
PopcornTV
Khán giả với HTVC
Góc thư giãn
Chồng nấu vợ khen
Chat với sao
Giai điệu tôi yêu

HTVC Ca Nhạc

Cửa sổ âm nhạc
Ca nhạc Việt Nam
Ca nhạc quốc tế
Giai điệu tôi yêu
New Playlist Việt Nam
New Playlist Quốc tế
HTV Music Countdown
V51-V52
Summer 
Số 6 may mắn 
Sweet

HTVC Du lịch & Cuộc sống

Cẩm nang du lịch
Điểm hẹn quanh ta
Khám phá
Ấn tượng kiến trúc
80 ngày vòng quanh thế giới 
Tiêu điểm du lịch
Điểm hẹn du lịch 
Hành trình cung bậc phương Nam
Á ngon quá
Những cuộc phiêu lưu kỳ thú
Trang du lịch
Biên niên sử Địa Trung Hải 
Kiến thức về động vật
Vua sáng tạo
Đất Việt mến yêu
Đời và đạo
Du lịch kỳ thú
Du lịch năm châu
Cuộc sống muôn màu
Vietnam - Destination I Love
Điểm đến ngày nay
Bản sắc Việt
Thương vụ tí hon
Tâm điểm 247
Điểm đến du lịch 
Du lịch khám phá
World Class Bartender
Khám phá Nagoya
Non nước lãng du
Khám phá thiên nhiên
Khám phá khoa học 
Giải mã cuộc sống 
Cuộc sống muôn màu
Hành trình Việt 
Du lịch châu Âu
Lịch sử Việt Nam 
Du lịch & cuộc sống 
Chân trời khoa học
Du lịch khám phá
Khoảnh khắc hành trình hơn 25 thế kỷ

HTVC Phim

Paramount Channel Vietnam
Thế giới điện ảnh

HTVC+ 
(VHC) Vina Home Shopping
(VHS) Viet Home Shopping

Channel B 

Món ăn của Ngôi sao
Ga 1105
Những anh chàng nhà bên
Trò đùa trên phố
Vblock
Mẫn nhi kế
Tạp chí thời trang
Thực đơn Vpop
Yêu Cine
360 độ giải trí
Rain Effect
Nâng tầm thương hiệu 
4 in Chers
Đẹp 360
Cụ ông đi phượt
Người nội trợ hoàn hảo
Thử thách dân hài
Cooking show
Màu thời gian
Điều chưa nói
Talkshow Channel B
Không gian Ký ức
Yan V-Pop 20
Bếp chiến
Ghế đỏ
Một ngày mới
Tạp chí Thời trang
Wazz Up - Bản tin giải trí
Radio 88.8
Larva - Những chú sâu tinh nghịch
Khám phá Malaysia cùng Martin Yan
Nhạc theo chủ đề
Nhạc Tổng hợp

HTVC Home Shopping - VGS Shop (GS Shop) 
Chương trình mua sắm khuyến mại (2013 - nay)

Quang Minh Home Shopping

VNK Home Shopping (2008 - 2010)
Chương trình mua sắm khuyến mại (2008 - 2010)

Vivi Home Shopping (2010 - 2012)
Chương trình mua sắm khuyến mại (2010 - 2012)

FBNC 

45 phút
128 hours
Bản tin 24/7
Bản tin công nghệ
Bản tin cuối tuần
Bản tin địa ốc
Bản tin kinh tế
Bản tin ngân hàng
Bất động sản 360
Biến đổi khí hậu 
Cà phê Sài Gòn
Cận cảnh
Cận cảnh thị trường 
Câu chuyện bất động sản
Câu chuyện kinh doanh
Chìa khóa Showbiz
Chia sẻ để thành công
Chuyên gia thị trường 
Chuyện người nổi tiếng
Covid 19 trong ngày 
Công nghệ thông minh
CSR
Cuộc sống thông minh
Cửa sổ công nghệ
Doanh nghiệp và xã hội 
Doanh nhân và Golf
Doanh nhân và thể thao
Dream House
Đầu tư giáo dục
Đồng tiền thông minh
FBNC Cận cảnh 
FBNC Hỏi và đáp
Gặp gỡ CEO Châu Á
Giờ đặt lệnh
Giờ kết sổ
Hàng hóa thị trường
Hàng Việt hội nhập
Không gian 4 chiều
Kinh tế cuối tuần
Kỳ tích kinh doanh
Nẻo đường tài chính
Ngã về phía trước
Nhà lãnh đạo doanh nghiệp
Nhận định thị trường Bất động sản
Những câu hỏi Liên quan đến Nhà đất
Phong cách doanh nhân
Sinh viên biện luận
Smart Money SV
Sức khỏe & Tiền
Tạp chí đầu tư giáo dục   
Tạp chí ngân hàng
Tầm nhìn thị trường 
Thế giới 24h (HTV)
Thế giới công nghệ
Tiêu điểm FBNC
Tin công nghệ
Tin mới nhận 
Tin sáng 30s
Tin tối 18h
Tin thế giới
Tin trong nước
Tin tức FBNC
Thể thao
Thể thao trong ngày
Thông tin mua bán bất động sản
Thời sự HTV 
Thủ thuật công nghệ
Tôi và Việt Nam
Top CEO
Trên lộ trình hội nhập 
Trò chuyện Hàng tuần
Văn hóa
World Wonder of Biz
Vietnam in Focus  
Việt Nam 24/7
Xây dựng thương hiệu mạnh
Xe hay TV

Astro Cảm xúc 

Phim truyện nước ngoài
Phim điện ảnh
Bộ tam siêu đẳng (TVB)
Giác quan phân thắng bại (TVB)
Bí mật ngôi sao (TVB)
Nhìn ra thế giới (TVB)
Siêu cấp chưởng môn nhân (TVB)

Other

New Year special program 

Táo quân
Hương xuân HTV
Chuyện HTV - Xuân
Nghệ sĩ mừng xuân
Ca vũ kịch đêm giao thừa 
Chuyện của tết - Chuyện của mùa xuân
Tết HTV
Tết hội ngộ - xuân yêu thương 
Tôi yêu....
Yêu
Xuân
Thở
Gala nhạc Việt
Hương tết Việt 
Tết làm điều hay
Sóng - Chunwan (HTV2) 
Hẹn hò mùa xuân
Thành phố tôi yêu - Nhìn từ trên cao
Tết của mỗi người
Xuân sum vầy
Lãnh đạo thành phố chúc tết
Tết doanh nhân
Hội ngộ HTV
Tạp chí khoa giáo xuân
Chuyện ngày xuân
Những sự kiện nổi bật của TPHCM
Gặp nhau là tết - Tết là gặp nhau
Ngẫm cười
Vẹn tròn vị tết
Vạn nụ cười xuân
Đón tết sum vầy
Bức họa thời gian
Chuyến tàu mùa xuân
HTV Chào xuân
Lần đầu xuân kể
Lời ru phía đại ngàn
Tự trào xuân
Những mảnh ghép mùa xuân
Xuân trong mắt trẻ thơ

Sport events 

Nhật ký World Cup/Euro/Olympic/Seagames....
Chuyên gia Euro
Cảm xúc Euro
Cuồng nhiệt Euro
Đi cùng World Cup, Euro, Olympic.....
Thử tài người hâm mộ
Đường tới Euro/WorldCup/Olympic....
HTV cùng Euro/World Cup....
Tiến tới Seagames, Olympic, World Cup, Euro...
Nhịp đập Seagames
Sắc màu Seagames
Tạp chí World Cup, Seagames, Euro...
Khoảnh khắc cùng World Cup
Sắc màu World Cup, Seagames, Euro...
Nhận diện anh tài World Cup (2006) 
Nhật ký Cúp truyền hình
Nhật ký đường đua (Cúp truyền hình)
Vua nước rút (Cúp truyền hình)
Du lịch cùng cúp truyền hình 2020
Những bánh xe quay nhanh (Cúp truyền hình)
Ngôi sao Cúp truyền hình
Những ngôi sao Euro (2004)
Những trận đấu hay nhất Euro (2004)

See also

List of television programmes broadcast by Vietnam Television (VTV)
List of programmes broadcast by Vietnam Television paytv
List of television programmes broadcast by Vinh Long TV (THVL)
List of programmes broadcast by VOV
List of programmes broadcast by VTC
List of programmes broadcast by Hanoi Radio Television
 List of television programmes
 List of animated television series
 List of comedy television series
 List of international game shows
 List of science fiction television programs
 List of television spin-offs

References

Ho Chi Minh City Television original programming
Vietnam
Vietnamese television series